The 1971 Chicago Bears season was their 52nd regular season completed in the National Football League. The team finished with a 6–8 record, another below .500 showing, eventually costing head coach Jim Dooley his job.  This was their 1st season at Soldier Field.

Offseason

NFL draft

Roster

Schedule

Game summaries

Week 1

Week 2

    
    
    
    
    
    
    

Dick Gordon 10 Rec, 115 Yds

Week 6

Chuck Hughes became the first NFL player to die on the field during a game.

Standings

References

Chicago Bears
Chicago Bears seasons
Chicago Bears